Dr Henry Norman Burgess Wettenhall AM (1915-2000) was an Australian paediatric endocrinologist, philanthropist, bibliophile and amateur ornithologist. Wettenhall was born in London while his family were living there before returning to Australia, where they lived in Toorak, Victoria. He was educated at Glamorgan, The Geelong College and the University of Melbourne, where he graduated from medicine in 1940.

He was a member of the Royal Australasian Ornithologists Union (RAOU), President 1978–1983, and elected a Fellow of the RAOU in 1989.  He was the principal fundraiser for the RAOU's Handbook of Australian, New Zealand and Antarctic Birds project.  He was a Member of the Order of Australia.

References

 Cowling, Sid. (2000). Obituary. Henry Norman Burgess Wettenhall, AM, MBBS, MD, MRACP, FRCP, FMV, FRAOU, 1915–2000.  Emu 100: 431–432.
 Robin, Libby. (2001). The Flight of the Emu: a hundred years of Australian ornithology 1901-2001. Carlton, Vic. Melbourne University Press.

External links
 Norman Wettenhall Foundation
 Henry Norman Burgess Wettenhall (1915-2000) Gravesite at Brighton General Cemetery (Vic)

Australian paediatricians
Australian ornithologists
British emigrants to Australia
Members of the Order of Australia
Australian book and manuscript collectors
1915 births
2000 deaths
20th-century Australian zoologists
Pediatric endocrinologists